Eola is an unincorporated community in northwestern Concho County in the U.S. state of Texas, near San Angelo. In 1990, Eola had a recorded population of 218. The community was first known as Jordan, but its name changed to Eola in 1902.

The Eola School was the center of the community from 1928 until it closed in 1983. On September 1, 1983, the Eola Independent School District consolidated into the Eden Consolidated Independent School District.

References

External links 
 

Unincorporated communities in Concho County, Texas
Unincorporated communities in Texas